The Dublin Footballer of the Year is an award presented to the best Gaelic football player of the year for Dublin GAA.

Former winners
1978 – Tony Hanahoe (St Vincents)
1992 – Vinny Murphy (Trinity Gaels)
1994 – Charlie Redmond (Naomh Barróg)
1995 – Dessie Farrell (Na Fianna)
1996 – Brian Stynes (Ballyboden St Enda's)
1997 – John O'Leary (O'Dwyers)
1998 – Brian Stynes (Ballyboden St Endas)
1999 – Ciarán Whelan (Raheny)
2000 – Paddy Christie (Ballymun Kickhams)
2001 – Darren Homan (Round Towers, Clondalkin)
2002 – Ray Cosgrove (Kilmacud Crokes)
2003 – Paddy Christie (Ballymun Kickhams)
2004 – Jason Sherlock (Na Fianna)
2005 – Tomás Quinn (St Vincents)
2006 – Alan Brogan (St Oliver Plunketts Eoghan Ruadh)

References
http://www.hill16.ie/

Gaelic football awards
   
Lists of Gaelic football players